Ménage or Tenue de soirée is a 1986 French comedy-drama film.

Ménage may also refer to:
 En ménage, an 1881 novel by French writer Joris-Karl Huysmans
 Ménage, a frequent error for manège, a rectangular arena for horse training and dressage
 Ménage problem, in combinatorial mathematics

People with the surname
 François-Xavier Ménage (born 1980), French journalist
 Gilles Ménage (1613–1692), French scholar
 Louis F. Menage (1850–1924), real estate speculator
 Marie Menage (born 1967), Mauritian Olympic windsurfer
 Nicki Minaj (born 1982), Trinidadian-American rapper from Queens, New York
 Victor Louis Ménage (1920–2015), British historian and Turkologist

See also
 
 Manege (disambiguation)
 Ménage à Trois (disambiguation)